In enzymology, an aconitate Δ-isomerase is an enzyme that catalyzes the chemical reaction

trans-aconitate  cis-aconitate

Hence, this enzyme has one substrate, trans-aconitate, and one product, cis-aconitate.

This enzyme belongs to the family of isomerases, specifically those intramolecular oxidoreductases transposing C=C bonds.  The systematic name of this enzyme class is aconitate Delta2-Delta3-isomerase. This enzyme is also called aconitate isomerase.

References

 
 

EC 5.3.3
Enzymes of unknown structure